Saint John the Baptist Parish (colloquially, Pinaglabanan Church; Filipino: Parokya ng San Juan Bautista and in Spanish: Parroquia de San Juan Bautista del Pinaglabanan) is a 19th-century Roman Catholic church in San Juan, Metro Manila, Philippines. It belongs to the Roman Catholic Archdiocese of Manila.

Name
The church derives its name from John the Baptist, to whom it is dedicated. He is both the patron saint and namesake of the city, which has the ceremonial name of "San Juan del Monte" (Saint John of the Mountain), owing to the area's hilly terrain.

The edifice is also known colloquially as the "Pinaglabanan Church", as it is several metres from the Pinaglabanan Shrine. The area near the church and shrine received the name "Pinaglabanan" (Tagalog for "battleground") as the Katipunan engaged the Spanish Empire in the Battle of San Juan del Monte, marking the start of the 1896 Philippine Revolution.

History

Establishment 
Although the parish was established on July 15, 1894, the construction of the first church happened a year after, under the supervision of architect Luis Arellano and the financial support of Mariano Artiaga. A Franciscan, Fr. Roman Pérez, OFM served as the first parish priest from 1894 until 1897.

The newly built church then enshrined a centuries-old image of John the Baptist, after whom the town is named.

Revolution against Spain 
On 30 August 1896, the Battle of San Juan del Monte between Filipino and Spanish troops occurred on the tract of land fronting the newly built church. The battle, which was one of the first in the Philippine Revolution, is commemorated annually at the shrine and park that stands today at the site.

Renovations 

Ramón J. Fernández spearheaded repairs to the church, which was damaged in the Revolution. When Fr. Hernando Antiporda (who later became Auxiliary Bishop of Manila) was parish priest in 1951, the church was renovated and expanded under the supervision of architect Otilio A. Arellano, grandson of the original architect, Luis Arellano. The younger Arellano notably preserved the original façade and nave of the structure. With the expansion, the church acquired two additional front doors.

Expansion 
In 1975, Msgr. Severino Casas built two mortuary chapels in the church compound. Changes in 1983 included the lengthening of the nave and the removal of the choir loft above the main door, as well as the installation of the crucifix above a new altar. The retablo (reredos) was preserved, while the antique image of St. John the Baptist—which was previously at the top-centre of the retablo—was moved to the Saint Joseph Chapel.

A rectory, social hall, and crypt were built in 1987 on the location of the Our Lady of Lourdes grotto built in 1955. A year later, a Perpetual Adoration Chapel was built, only to be demolished to make way for the Holy Child Parochial School (now the St. John the Baptist Catholic School). A smaller, air-conditioned Adoration Chapel at the ground floor of the school near the church's southern entrance was finished in 2009.

Declaration as Historical Landmark 
The St. John the Baptist Church was declared as a historical landmark through San Juan Municipal Council Resolution, Ordinance No. 63 Series of 1989.

On 15 May 1994, the Feast of the Ascension, Jaime Cardinal Sin, Archbishop of Manila, blessed and inaugurated the new San Juan Centennial Belfry, built to commemorate the church's hundredth anniversary. Architects Renato Berroya and Arsenio Topacio designed the structure, which matches the façade, and houses the church bell that dates to 1896.

Parish Priests

Gallery

See also 
San Juan, Metro Manila
Pinaglabanan Shrine
St. John the Baptist Catholic School

References

External links 

Official Website of St. John the Baptist Parish

Roman Catholic churches in Metro Manila
Buildings and structures in San Juan, Metro Manila
Churches in the Roman Catholic Archdiocese of Manila